The slendertail moray eel (Gymnothorax gracilicauda) is a moray eel found in coral reefs in the Pacific Ocean. It was first named by Jenkins in 1903, and is also commonly known as the graceful-tailed moray.

References

gracilicauda
Fish described in 1903
[[Category:Taxa named by Oliver Peebles Jenkins]